Triangulum is a northern constellation.

Triangulum may also refer to:

Astronomy
Triangulum Minus, an obsolete constellation which is part of Triangulum
Triangulum Australe, a small southern constellation
Triangulum Australe (Chinese astronomy)
Triangulum (Chinese astronomy)
Triangulum Galaxy, a spiral galaxy visible in Triangulum
Triangulum II, a dwarf galaxy companion of the Milky Way Galaxy

Other
USS Triangulum (AK-102), a US Navy cargo ship
 The "Triangulum" story arc, an arc found in Shin Megami Tensei: Devil Survivor 2
 Triangulum (species), species by the name 'triangulum'

See also
 Triangle (disambiguation)